"Se Preparó" is a song by Puerto Rican singer Ozuna released in 2017.

Background
"Se Preparó" was released on August 11, 2017, as the first prelude to his debut album Odisea. The song was written by Ozuna, José Aponte, Carlos Ortiz, Luis Ortiz, Juan River, Vicente Saavedra, and his producers Bless The Producer, Hi Music Hi Flow, Gabi Music and Chris Jeday, addresses in his lyrics about a relationship in which a girl has a boyfriend who is unfaithful and treats her badly, which promises changes that in the end never come.

In August 2018, a remix version had been announced with the singer Farruko and Maluma, and his producers Julian Turizo, Chris Jeday, Gaby Music, Ray El Ingeniero and Hi Music Hi Flow.

Music video
"Se Preparó" was released on August 11, 2017 on YouTube and was recorded in Caracas, Venezuela and was directed by the Venezuelan producer Nuno Gomes, as of January 2021, the song has received 1.3 billion views.

Charts

Weekly charts

Year-end charts

Certifications

References

2017 songs
2017 singles
Songs written by Ozuna (singer)
Ozuna (singer) songs